The Croatian interlace or Croatian wattle, known as the  or  in Croatian, is a type of interlace, most characteristic for its three-ribbon pattern. It is one of the most often used patterns of pre-romanesque Croatian art. It is found on and within churches as well as monasteries built in early medieval Kingdom of Croatia between the 9th and beginning of the 12th century.
The ornamental strings were sometimes grouped together with animal and herbal figures.

Most representative examples of inscriptions embellished with the interlace include the Baška tablet, baptismal font of Duke Višeslav of Croatia and the Branimir Inscription. Other notable examples are located near Knin, in Ždrapanj and Žavić by the Bribir settlement, Rižinice near Solin and in Split and Zadar.

Croatia has a civil and military decoration called the Order of the Croatian Interlace.

Pleter Cross
During the 8th century, the Pope assigned Croatia with its own idiosyncratic cross based on Croatian interlace. It is commonly known as The Pleter Cross. The symbol is still very much used and adored in Croatia in the modern day as it represents both Christianity and Croatian Culture.

Gallery
Examples:

See also
 Interlace (art)
 Croatian pre-Romanesque art and architecture

References

External links

 The Croatian "pleter" on Croata.com
 pticica.com - wattle examples

Medieval Croatia
Croatian culture
Decorative knots
Interlace
Interlace
Interlace
Interlace
Stone sculptures in Croatia
Visual motifs